French football club SC Bastia's 1994–95 season. Finished 15th place in league. Top scorer of the season, including 16 goals in 12 league matches have been Anto Drobnjak. Was eliminated to Coupe de France end of 16 and the Coupe de la Ligue was able to be among the final.

Transfers

In 
Summer
 Morlaye Soumah from Valenciennes
 Pierre Laurent from Brive
 Anto Drobnjak from Red Star Belgrade
 Franck Vandecasteele from Laval
 Jean-Christophe Debu from Toulouse
 Pascal Camadini from Bastia B
 Stéphane Ziani from Nantes
 Flavio from free
 Frédéric Darras, Bernard Maraval and Eric Dewilder from Sochaux

Winter
 No.

Out 
Summer
 Michel Padovani to retired
 Hamid Bourabaa to Istres
 Eric Mura to Vitrolles
 Laurent Castro to Gazélec Ajaccio
 Stéphane Michel to Lyon Duchère
 Aziz El-Ouali to Châteauroux

Winter
 No.

Squad

French Division 1

League table

Results summary

Results by round

Matches

Coupe de France

Coupe de la Ligue

Top scorers

References 

SC Bastia seasons
Bastia